Wilber Alejandro Sánchez Ramírez (born October 24, 1979) is a Nicaraguan footballer who currently plays for  Real Estelí.

Club career
He started his career at second division Inter Barrio Cuba and played for Walter Ferretti, Parmalat, Masatepe and Real Estelí.

El Salvador
After a stunning performance in the 2007 UNCAF Nations Cup, played in San Salvador, Sánchez joined San Salvador F.C. In his debut game, the speedy striker came on as a substitute in the 65th minutes, but managed to score 2 headed goals, giving his side the victory, 3–2, against Vista Hermosa.

In June 2007 he was snapped up by América Managua but left them for Walter Ferretti a year later. He has played for Real Estelí since 2010.

International career
Sánchez made his debut for Nicaragua in an April 2001 friendly match against Belize and has earned a total of 19 caps, scoring no goals. He has represented his country in 2 FIFA World Cup qualification matches and played at the 2001, 2007, 2009, and 2011 UNCAF Nations Cups as well as at the 2009 CONCACAF Gold Cup.

His final international was a January 2011 UNCAF Nations Cup match against Belize.

Personal life
He is married to Jessica Matamoros and they have a daughter, Briana.

References

External links
 

1979 births
Living people
Sportspeople from Managua
Association football forwards
Nicaraguan men's footballers
Nicaragua international footballers
2001 UNCAF Nations Cup players
2007 UNCAF Nations Cup players
2009 UNCAF Nations Cup players
2009 CONCACAF Gold Cup players
2011 Copa Centroamericana players
C.D. Walter Ferretti players
Real Estelí F.C. players
San Salvador F.C. footballers
Nicaraguan expatriate footballers
Expatriate footballers in El Salvador
Nicaraguan expatriate sportspeople in El Salvador